Raymond Jellema (born 27 September 1985) is a Scottish footballer who plays as a goalkeeper and is currently without a club after leaving Elgin City.

Career
Raised in Ayr, he signed his first professional contract for Hamilton Academical during the 2002–03 season.

While appearances in the first season of his career were not forthcoming, Jellema made his debut appearance for the club in a Second Division match against his future team Alloa Athletic during Hamilton's promotion-winning 2003–04 season. Still the second choice goalkeeper during 2004–05, due to David McEwan's presence at the club during this time (strangely enough, McEwan himself would later join Alloa), Jellema made four First Division appearances during the 2005-06 campaign. Jellema became a regular first-team goalkeeper during the 2006–07 season, starting eighteen league games, as Hamilton finished in fourth position in the table.

As the 2007–08 season got under way, Jellema transferred to Alloa for free. After two seasons at Alloa, in the summer of 2009, Jellema moved to the Republic of the Congo, Africa where he spent two years working on and offshore with French Oil Company, Total.

Upon returning to Scotland, Jellema signed for Peterhead. He was released by the club in May 2012.

After a year without a club, Jellema signed for Elgin City on 19 July 2013. He left Elgin at the end of the 2013–14 season when he wasn't given a new contract.

References

External links
Raymond Jellema at Soccerbase

1985 births
Living people
Hamilton Academical F.C. players
Alloa Athletic F.C. players
Peterhead F.C. players
Elgin City F.C. players
Scottish Football League players
Scottish footballers
Scottish Professional Football League players
Association football goalkeepers
Footballers from Irvine, North Ayrshire